Tharangam may mean:
Tarangini (music), the most prominent musical compositions of Narayana Teertha, the 17th century Carnatic music composer
Tharangam (1979 film), a 1979 Indian Malayalam film, directed by Baby
Tharangam (2017 film), The Curious Case of Kallan Pavithran, a Malayalam black comedy thriller film directed by Dominic Arun